Zekate House, is a house in Gjirokastër, Albania. The house, built in 1812, is said to be "one of the grandest examples of Gjirokastër architecture in the Ottoman style".

Fortified tower houses, (known as kullë in Albanian), belonged to wealthy people, such as government officials or merchants. All rooms have a basic design: a safe ground floor with a wooden gallery on top, which are the most important rooms for an extended family. The decks are placed on the walls to help defend against the enemies they attack. Zekate's house is an example of an urban kullë. Built in 1811–1812, it has two towers and a large double arch facade. The panorama of the city can be viewed from the house.

Gallery

References

Buildings and structures in Gjirokastër
Houses in Albania
Tower houses
Ottoman architecture in Albania
Houses completed in 1812